is a Japanese football player for Aventura Kawaguchi.

Club statistics
Updated to 2 December 2022.

References

External links
Profile at Roasso Kumamoto

Profile at Thespakusatsu Gunma 
Profile at Omiya Ardija

1991 births
Living people
Chuo University alumni
Association football people from Saitama Prefecture
Japanese footballers
J1 League players
J2 League players
J3 League players
Omiya Ardija players
Thespakusatsu Gunma players
Roasso Kumamoto players
Blaublitz Akita players
Association football defenders